Horní Brusnice is a municipality and village in Trutnov District in the Hradec Králové Region of the Czech Republic. It has about 400 inhabitants.

Sights
Among the landmarks are the Church of Saint Nicholas and a number of log houses and farmsteads, several of which are protected as cultural monuments.

References

Villages in Trutnov District